Hood's Magazine and Comic Miscellany was a monthly journal originally published by Thomas Hood. A total of 61 issues were published from January 1844 to June 1849. Hood made most of the original material for it. After his death in 1845, Charles Rowcroft became the editor. The magazine was not particularly successful, partly due to the refusal to take on a publisher.

Sources
 
http://www.victorianweb.org/authors/hood/hallbio.html
Hood's Magazine and Comic Miscellany archive at HathiTrust

1844 establishments in the United Kingdom
1849 disestablishments in the United Kingdom
Defunct literary magazines published in the United Kingdom
Monthly magazines published in the United Kingdom
Magazines established in 1844
Magazines disestablished in 1849